The 1988 Amílcar Cabral Cup was held in Bissau, Guinea-Bissau.

Group stage

Group A

Group B

Knockout stage

Semi-finals

Third place match

Final

Note: There are contradictory reports of this match. According to the RSSSF page for the 1988 tournament, the match ended in 0–0 and Guinea won 4–2 on penalties. On a list of international matches of 1988, the match ended in 0–0 and Guinea won 3–2 on penalties. According to a head-to-head search between Guinea and Mali on FIFA website, Guinea won 3–2 in regular time.

References
RSSSF archives

Amílcar Cabral Cup